Dailekh District  a part of Karnali Province, is one of the 77 districts of Nepal.

Etymology
It is said that the name Dailekh is derived from Dadhi Lekh. Dadhi stands for Dadhichi. Dadhichi was a sage in ancient time and Lekh mean hill. Etymologically ‘Dadhi Lekh’ means the hill where sage Dadhichi meditated. There is also another story about name that, in ancient time it was a place of Devatas, so it called "Daibalok" which later became 'Dailekh'.

History
Dailekh District was a part of Khasa kingdom during 12th to 14th century. Sinja Valley was the ancient capital city and powerful town of the Khasa Kingdom After the fall down of the Khasa Kingdom it divided into many small kingdoms. Before the unification of modern Nepal, the area of the Karnali region had a united kingdom named Baise Rajya (Twenty two principalities). Dailekh principality was one in twenty two principalities.

Geography and climate

Dailekh is a high, hilly district out of ten districts of Karnali Province. It is situated at coordinates of 28° 35' 00" N to 29° 08' 00" N Latitudes and 81° 25' 00" E to 81° 53' 00" E of Longitudes. The lowest elevation is 544m and the highest elevation is 4,168m. The headquarter is situated at an elevation of 1448m. The district has covered 80% of mid-hill land and 21% of high-hill land.

On the basis of altitude,this district can be classified into 4 different sub-categories:

Transportation
Dailekh is connected with Birendranagar (the capital city of Karnali Province) with a road called Dailekh road (F-48). Dailekh road meets to Ratna Highway (NH-12) at Birendranagar (Surkhet). Ratna Highway is connected with Mahendra Highway (NH-1) at Kohalpur. Through Mahendra Highway one can get access to Kathmandu, Pokhara and other cities of Nepal.

There is another road connecting Dailekh to Karnali Highway (NH-13) via Dullu.

Demographics
At the time of the 2011 Nepal census, Dailekh District had a population of 261,770, Of these, 97.9% spoke Nepali, 1.5% Magar, 0.2% Gurung, 0.1% Kham, 0.1% Tamang and 0.1% other languages as their first language.

In terms of ethnicity/caste, 34.8% were Chhetri, 18.6% Kami, 14.1% Thakuri, 10.9% Hill Brahmin, 9.2% Magar, 5.0% Damai/Dholi, 3.1% Sarki, 1.5% Sanyasi/Dasnami, 1.3% Gurung, 0.3% Badi, 0.3% Newar, 0.2% other Dalit, 0.2% Musalman, 0.1% Kumal, 0.1% Tamang and 0.1% others.

In terms of religion, 97.4% were Hindu, 1.9% Buddhist, 0.5% Christian and 0.2% Muslim.

In terms of literacy, 62.3% could read and write, 3.3% could only read and 34.3% could neither read nor write.

Constituency
Dailekh comprises 2 parliamentary seats and 4 provincial seats:

Divisions of Dailekh
As per the new constitution of Nepal 2015, the district is divided into 4 urban municipalities and 7 rural municipality;

Former VDCs and Municipalities

Gallery

See also
Zones of Nepal

References

External links
Volunteer Charity Work
District Development Committee, Dailekh

 
Districts of Nepal established during Rana regime or before
Districts of Karnali Province